Melvin Rhyne (October 12, 1936 – March 5, 2013), was a jazz organist best known for his work with Wes Montgomery.

Biography
Melvin Rhyne was born in Indianapolis in 1936 and started playing the piano shortly after. At 19 years old, Rhyne started playing piano with then-unknown tenor saxophonist Rahsaan Roland Kirk but quickly switched over to the instrument that would make him famous: the Hammond B3 organ. Rhyne's piano skills translated to the organ fluently and before long he was backing famous blues players like B.B. King and T-Bone Walker. In 1959 he was asked to join fellow Indianapolis musician Wes Montgomery's newly formed trio.

Rhyne then moved to Wisconsin and largely kept to himself for the next two decades. In 1991, however, he played on Herb Ellis's album Roll Call, Brian Lynch's At the Main Event, and his own album, The Legend. He continued to be prolific in the years to come, releasing eight more solo albums on the Criss Cross Jazz label. Rhyne also recorded with The Mark Ladley Trio for the 1992 release, Strictly Business and the 1994 release, Evidence. Both landed in the Jazz Charts at CMJ New Music Report and The Gavin Report. The group also appeared on a Jazziz Magazine sampler disc during that time. Altenburgh Records posthumously released, Final Call in 2013 by the same group.

In 2008 Rhyne teamed up with fellow Indianapolis jazz musician Rob Dixon to form the Dixon-Rhyne Project, a boundary-pushing jazz quartet that also includes Chicago guitarist Fareed Haque and drummer Kenny Phelps. The quartet released the album Reinvention in 2008 on Indianapolis jazz label Owl Studios. Rhyne's later career trio included guitarist Peter Bernstein and drummer Kenny Washington in the same organ, guitar, drum formation of the original Wes Montgomery Trio.

He died in his hometown of Indianapolis of lung cancer at the age of 76.

Discography

References

External links
Discogs

1936 births
2013 deaths
Hard bop organists
American jazz organists
American male organists
Musicians from Indianapolis
American male jazz musicians
The Dixon-Rhyne Project members
Criss Cross Jazz artists
Riverside Records artists